Cyrus vs. Cyrus: Design and Conquer is an American reality television series that premiered on May 25, 2017, on Bravo. Announced in October 2016, the half-hour show features Tish and Brandi Cyrus, a mother-daughter duo, working together on various interior design projects.

Episodes

References

External links 
 

2010s American reality television series
2017 American television series debuts
2017 American television series endings
Bravo (American TV network) original programming
English-language television shows